Göpel is a surname of Germanic origin, which stems from the ancient Germanic personal name Godebald composed of the elements gōd "good" or god "god" + bald "bold brave". Persons with this name include:
 Adolph Göpel (1812–1847), German mathematician
 Barbara Göpel (1922–2017), German art historian
 Erhard Göpel (1906–1966), German art historian and high level Nazi agent
 Maja Göpel (born 1976), German political economist, transformation researcher, and sustainability scientist

See also 
 Göbel
 Gobel (disambiguation)
 Goebel (disambiguation)
 Goebbels (disambiguation)

German-language surnames
Surnames from given names